MOSP may refer to:

 Mathematical Olympiad Summer Program, at Carnegie Mellon University, US
 PTPMT1 or MOSP, a protein
 DUSP23 or MOSP, an enzyme
 Monmouth Off Street Project, of the Gwent Police; See Monmouth Police Station